Young Storytellers, formerly known as the Young Storytellers Foundation, is an arts education non-profit operating primarily in Los Angeles.

Young Storytellers currently serves elementary, middle, and high school students in Southern California, including the cities of Los Angeles, Culver City, Santa Monica, Burbank, New York City, Austin, Little Rock, and Akron. Young Storytellers supports students in Title 1 schools; these are schools and school districts with the highest concentrations of poverty in which academic performance tends to be low and the obstacles to raising performance are the greatest. The program improves writing and self-confidence while also focusing on social and emotional learning and including components of Learning for Justice's Social Justice Standards.

History
Young Storytellers began as an in-school mentoring program in 1997. The company was founded by three screenwriters Mikkel Bondesen, Brad Falchuk, and Andrew Barrett upon learning about cutbacks in funding for creative arts programs in the Los Angeles public schools. The first school adopted into the program was Playa Del Rey Elementary School in Culver City. The program was incorporated as a 501(c)(3) in 2003.

Programs
The organization supports students elementary, middle, and high school.

Script to Stage
This 9-week, Common Core-aligned elementary school program places students with an adult mentor one-on-one to write scripts that are entirely their own, then actors perform those for the students and their peers live at a show. The Script to Stage program uplifts individual student voices as they craft stories based on important lessons from their own lives, and build characters with strong motivations by looking at the communities and circumstances that affect their behavior.

Collaborative Stories
This 9-week program is based on the foundation of Script to Stage, but facilitates more collaboration as writers work together to tell a story through large group sessions guided by 1-2 mentors. When their story is complete, students watch it come to life with the help of professional actors at a Big Show. As part of this program, students reflect on challenges and unfairness they’ve seen or experienced in their own lives, and work with the group to find nonviolent solutions to these events through metaphor and story. This program began in Spring 2020 as an adaptation for the switch to online learning.

Day of Story
A condensed version of the Script to Stage program, Day of Story is a one-day, in-school workshop that pairs mentors one-on-one with 4th grade students to help them create their own story outline along with a descriptive poster. This program helps students to draw connections between characters and their own lives, and share about their personal identity within groups. Young Storytellers has run Day of Story workshops with variable sizes of groups (anywhere from 20–100 adult mentors), with corporations such as Disney, U.S. Bank, and NBCUniversal.

Middle School Stories
A mixture of adult mentorship and collective exploration, students in our middle school program work collaboratively with a group mentor to create first person narratives about challenges they face and then work with actors who later perform those pieces.

High School Stories
In this teacher-led program, high school students create stories that represent their communities. With the help of mentor support and coaching, students identify communities that bring them a sense of belonging and unpack how they see their communities represented by various types of media. Then, students work in groups to create stories they believe represent their self identified communities. The program culminates in a live show where actors perform student pieces.  Volunteer actors then perform their work.

Story Time
A free 12-video online video series created in partnership with AT&T  that serves as a guide that allows students to create their own stories directly from their own homes. This program was created to serve more students during Covid-19 when students were not able to participate in in-person programs.

Collaborations & Corporate Funder Projects

Story Time
A free 12-video online video series created in partnership with AT&T  that serves as a guide that allows students to create their own stories directly from their own homes. This program was created to serve more students during Covid-19 when students were not able to participate in in-person programs.

Warner Bros. Discovery Story Lab 
Story Lab, a Warner Bros. Discovery program developed in partnership with LAUSD’s Arts Education Branch and Division of Instruction, delivers original curriculum to sixth-grade middle school students that focuses on core storytelling skills while reinforcing confidence, empathy, and personal voice through self-reflection and creativity. Warner Bros. Discovery and DC Entertainment lent the use of its DC Super Heroes as a tool to get students to think about heroes in their lives and their own “superpowers.”

The Achievery 
This free digital learning platform through AT&T is designed to make distance learning more engaging, entertaining, and inspiring for K-12 students. Our fun multimedia lessons and activities teach storytelling, social emotional learning skills, and English Language Arts.

Young Storytellers' Values

Belonging
"We celebrate originality and individuality. Our community is made better when we can speak fully from our unique perspectives and identities.”

Connection
“People are at the center of everything we do. Genuine connection requires empathy, sensitivity, and honesty.”

Exploration
“Being vulnerable and inventive requires a supportive environment. We foster spaces where we can explore ourselves, the communities in which we live, and how we can impact the world.”

Play
“Play with a purpose allows us to investigate the world with wonder. This is how we open the road to creativity.”

Equity 
“Unique identities, backgrounds, and perspectives make the world a better place. We fight against the racism, prejudice, and bias that exist in our systems and cultures so that all people are treated with respect and dignity.”

Volunteers
Programs are run by volunteer Head Mentors and volunteer Mentors. Mentors in the Script to Stage Program work one-on-one with a student for the duration of the nine-week program to create a screenplay and the resulting screenplay is then performed by a volunteer performer. There are currently over 1,200 volunteers in Los Angeles serving more than 2,000 students in 60 schools.

Funding
The organization received grants from the Hollywood Foreign Press Association multiple times. In 2013 the organization was represented by Olivia Wilde and received a portion of the $1.6 million in grants given by the HFPA that year. 2016 in the amount of $10,000.

In 2015, the organization received a grant from the $4.5 million given to the Los Angeles arts scene from Michael Bloomberg Philanthropies. Jane Fonda's, Georgia Campaign for Adolescent Power & Potential, has also provided funding.

Notable Partnerships
In 2016, 20th Century Fox invited Young Storytellers students to participate in the Fox Writers Intensive.

March 2017, Young Storytellers partnered with Disney to give a group of students early access to see the live action version of Beauty and the Beast These students then created their own stories based on the film. Then, in collaboration with Tongal, an independent creative network, the students’ stories were turned into live action and animated short films.

In February 2018, a group of Young Storytellers students were invited to a special premier of Disney’s  A Wrinkle in Time and given the opportunity to create and then share stories based on the film. Disney then turned these stories into either short films or live performances to highlight the students’ storytelling.

In October 2020, Young Storytellers partnered with Netflix to have members of the Over the Moon cast host a dramatic reading of a student's story.

Notable performers

Young Storytellers' annual fundraiser, "The Biggest Show," invites actors and comedians from film and television to perform their student's screenplays. In 2014, Rob Corddry stated, "[the program] is kind of mythical in this world that I run in. You can't have a bad time. There's no pressure. You can't fail. It's pretty much everything you want as an actor. It's pretty much everything I've been looking for my whole life". In 2016, when asked about "The Biggest Show," Seth Rogen said: "One of the main things that made me want to do it was to encourage these kids to continue to do this stuff. I was not the type of person that would persevere through discouragement at that age."

List of Biggest Show Performers from 2014 to 2022:

 Rob Corddry
 Max Greenfield
 John Cho
 Alison Brie
 Jillian Bell
 Stephanie Beatriz
 Keegan-Michael Key
 Jack Black
 Judy Greer
 Tom Lennon
 Jason Mantzoukas
 Jordan Peele
 Seth Rogen
 Martin Starr
 Nasim Pedrad
 Charlie Day
 John Cho
 Danny Pudi
 Busy Philipps
 Yvonne Orji
 Tony Hale
 J.B. Smoove
 Molly Shannon
 Natasha Rothwell
 Jimmi Simpson
 Georgia King
 Jermaine Fowler
 Sklar Brothers
 Aparna Nancherla
 Bobby Moynihan
 David Oyelowo
 Jake Johnson
 Olivia Munn
 Whitney Cummings
 Cedric the Entertainer
 Will Forte
 Randall Park
 Chelsea Peretti
 Kaitlin Olson
 Roselyn Sanchez
 Marcel Spears
 Bassem Youssef
 Rob McElhenney
 D'Arcy Carden
 Baron Vaughn
 Marcel Spears
 Aparna Nancherla
 Pete Pasco
 Chrissie Fit
 Mia Mollicone
 Santino Jimenez
 Pamela Adlon
 Oscar Nunez
 Queen Latifah
 Harry Shum Jr.
 Julissa Calderon
 Kelly Marie Tran
 Lindy Booth
 Marcus Henderson
 Shelby Rabara
 Ashley Nicole Black
 Atsuko Okatsuka
 Peter Kim

See also
Freedom Writers Foundation
Story Pirates

References

External links
Young Storytellers - official website
E!Online - article about Young Storytellers fundraiser
NPR audio article - Gloria Hillard reports on the Young Storytellers Foundation
NPR radio play - Day to Day presents a radio play written by a Young Storytellers student and starring Dustin Hoffman

Non-profit organizations based in California
Arts organizations based in California
Charities based in California